Daniel Fortunato Borges (born 23 March 1993), known as Daniel Borges, is a Brazilian professional footballer who plays for Botafogo, on loan from Mirassol. Mainly a right back, he can also play as a midfielder.

Club career
Born in São José dos Campos, São Paulo, Daniel Borges graduated from Botafogo-SP's youth setup. He made his debut on 27 March 2011, coming on as a substitute for Túlio Souza in a 0–4 home loss against Linense for the Campeonato Paulista championship.

In July 2013 Daniel Borges was loaned to Série A side Vitória, until December. He made his debut in the competition on the 21st, in a 0–0 home draw against Bahia.

On 4 April 2014, after appearing in the year's Paulistão with his parent club, Daniel Borges moved to Ponte Preta on loan until the end of the year. He appeared in 13 matches for the latter, helping the club return to the top level at first attempt.

On 18 December 2014 Daniel Borges joined Atlético Paranaense, in a season-long loan deal.

Honours
Botafogo
 Campeonato Brasileiro Série B: 2021

Botafogo-SP
 Campeonato Brasileiro Série D: 2015

References

External links
 
 Daniel Borges at playmakerstats.com (English version of ogol.com.br)

1993 births
Living people
People from São José dos Campos
Brazilian footballers
Association football defenders
Association football midfielders
Campeonato Brasileiro Série A players
Campeonato Brasileiro Série B players
Campeonato Brasileiro Série C players
Campeonato Brasileiro Série D players
Botafogo Futebol Clube (SP) players
Esporte Clube Vitória players
Associação Atlética Ponte Preta players
Club Athletico Paranaense players
Atlético Clube Goianiense players
Oeste Futebol Clube players
Mirassol Futebol Clube players
Clube de Regatas Brasil players
América Futebol Clube (MG) players
Botafogo de Futebol e Regatas players
Footballers from São Paulo (state)